Villeneuve-Prairie is a closed station in Choisy-le-Roi, Val-de-Marne, Île-de-France, France. The station was closed on 15 December 2013, and was replaced by Créteil-Pompadour station, around 800 meters to the northeast. It is on the Paris-Marseille railway. This station served the commune of Choisy-le-Roi and the neighbouring Creteil.

Station info
The station is at the 10.7 kilometer point of the Paris–Marseille railway. According to the RER D Blog:

Train services
The following services served Villeneuve-Prairie station:

Local services (RER D) Creil–Orry-la-Ville–Coye–Goussainville–Saint-Denis–Gare de Lyon–Villeneuve-Saint-Georges–Juvisy–Corbeil–Essonnes
Local services (RER D) Goussainville–Saint-Denis–Gare de Lyon–Villeneuve-Saint-Georges–Montgeron-Crosne–Combs-la-Ville–Quincy–Melun

References

Railway stations in Val-de-Marne
Réseau Express Régional stations